State Highway 217 (SH 217) is a Texas state highway running from Canyon east to the Palo Duro Canyon State Park where it becomes Texas Park Road 5.  The route was designated on May 29, 1935.

Junction list

References

217
Transportation in Randall County, Texas